The Mistress of Monbijou (German: Die Herrin von Monbijou) is a 1924 German silent romance film directed by Frederic Zelnik and starring Lya Mara and Hermann Böttcher.

Cast
Ulrich Bettac
Hermann Böttcher
Lya Mara
Albert Patry
Julia Serda

References

External links

Films of the Weimar Republic
Films directed by Frederic Zelnik
German silent feature films
German black-and-white films
German romance films
1920s romance films
1920s German films